Simba is a 1955 British war drama film  directed by Brian Desmond Hurst, and starring Dirk Bogarde, Donald Sinden, Virginia McKenna, and Basil Sydney. The screenplay concerns a British family living in East Africa, who become embroiled in the Mau Mau Uprising.

Plot
Alan Howard is returning to his family's farm in Kenya in order to become a farmer. After reuniting with the nurse Mary Crawford, he discovers that his brother David has been murdered by the Mau Mau. The rebels have daubed the word "Simba" (Lion) in his brother's house. Alan also reunites with Mary's parents who disagree on the ideology of the rebellion and the nature of the native Africans.

The next day, Alan meets with Colonel Bridgeman who is in charge of a local police militia. While questioning rebel suspects, one of them flees, and is shot while trying to escape. He is confirmed Mau Mau from his fresh initiation scars. Alan also meet up with Dr Karanja who runs the local dispensary where Mary works. Alan and Mary later join a town meeting for white farmers. Although it is clear that many natives have been forced to join the Mau Mau because they fear them, the farmers cannot agree on what needs to be done. Alan's prejudice against the natives becomes stronger. That night, another rebel takes the Mau Mau-oath in full display of the local tribe. Another native refuses the ritual, and is put to death.

Dr Karanja later advices Alan to leave Kenya, but he refuses, believing the doctor to be in league with the rebels. Many warnings are given to Alan by the Mau Mau, but he chooses to stay, even after he is attacked by a rebel in his own house. The attacker is shot by Mary's father, and later dies in the hospital, uttering only the name "Simba". Dr Karanja angrily confronts Alan's suspicions of him by showing him his lack of initiation scars, and Alan concedes his sincerity.

Alan and Mary rekindle their relationship. Their harmony is broken when the rebels attack the home of Mary's parents and murder her father. After witnessing the violence, Dr Karanja confesses that his father is "Simba", the leader of the local rebels. The police hunt down Simba, but he manages to escape. The next day, all of the workers on Alan's farm have fled in fear. A rebel close to Simba informs Colonel Bridgewater that Simba is in Manoa, and the police make their way to Alan's farm, believing it will be attacked. Dr Karanja and Mary are also informed by Alan's runaway houseboy that Simba is going to attack Alan's farm, and make their way to it. That night, Alan, Mary and Dr Karanja are held up on the farm, while it is overrun by the Mau Mau. Dr Karanja tries to peacefully confront his father. Simba attacks him, but is shot down by Alan. The rebels then cut down Dr Karanja before the police arrive.

Cast
 Dirk Bogarde - Alan Howard
 Donald Sinden - Inspector Drummond
 Virginia McKenna - Mary Crawford
 Basil Sydney - Mr Crawford
 Marie Ney - Mrs Crawford
 Joseph Tomelty - Doctor Hughes
 Earl Cameron - Karanja
 Orlando Martins - Headman
 Ben Johnson - Kimani
 Frank Singuineau - Waweru
 Huntley Campbell - Joshua
 Slim Harris - Chege
 Glyn Lawson - Mundati
 Harry Quashie - Thakla
 John Chandos - Settler
 Desmond Roberts - Colonel Bridgeman 
 Errol John - African Inspector

Production

Development
The box-office success of The Planter's Wife (1952) saw Rank become interested in making films about other contemporary Imperial stories and head of production Earl St. John put out a call for story submissions to do with the Mau Mau Uprising. Anthony Perry obliged with a treatment and he was sent to Kenya, where his advisers included Charles Njonjo. The treatment had to be approved by the War Office, the Colonial Office, and the white settler organisation, the Voice of Kenya. The script was written by another writer, John Baines.

Shooting
The film was shot at Pinewood Studios, with second unit photography in Kenya. The producers had originally hoped to cast Jack Hawkins in the lead and used a double in Kenya to match him in long shot. When Hawkins was unavailable, Bogarde was cast instead and much of the Kenyan footage covering Hawkins could not be used. However, they had also used a tall, blond Rhodesian policeman as the long shot stand-in for the part of Inspector Drummond, but had difficulty finding an available blond actor in England to play the part and so match up the shots. A chance meeting in the bar at Pinewood between the director Brian Desmond Hurst and Donald Sinden, who had had to dye his hair blond for the comedy film Mad About Men, led to Sinden being cast as Drummond.

Several of the Mau Mau were played by real Mau Mau rebels under death sentence; they were executed three days after filming.

Reception

The film premiered at Leicester Square Theatre on 19 January 1955, and was released in New York City in 1956. Simba led to Virginia McKenna signing to Rank for a long-term contract. Brian Desmond Hurst said "She has a terrific future, properly handled. She has all the qualities of a young Bergman and a young Katharine Hepburn."

Simba was banned by the Kenyan censorship board. The film has been criticised by historians for its depiction of Africans and colonialism; historian Herbert A. Friedman wrote that "In the United States the images were all pro-British and avid audiences watched motion pictures on the subject such as the 1955 Simba, where the Mau Mau were depicted as murderous hordes or betrayers who murdered their white masters, friends, and children in their beds." In Terrorism, Media, Liberation, scholar John David Slocum noted that "no mention is made of the Kikuyu socioeconomic situation, or grievances over the question of land ownership."

References

External links
 
Simba at TCMDB
Official legacy website of the director Brian Desmond Hurst, with filmography including Simba
Simba at Screenonline

1955 films
1950s war drama films
British war drama films
Films directed by Brian Desmond Hurst
Films shot in Kenya
Films set in Kenya
Films set in the British Empire
Films shot at Pinewood Studios
Lippert Pictures films
1950s English-language films
1950s British films